Najla Said (born 1974) is an American author, actress, playwright, and activist. Through her literary and academic work, Said has confronted racism, stereotyping, social and economic inequality, and among others, the specific challenges that face immigrant and second-generation Americans.

Life
Said grew up on the Upper West Side of Manhattan. Her father was the noted postcolonial scholar and public intellectual Edward Said. She graduated from the Chapin School and Princeton University and trained in acting at The Shakespeare Lab of the Public Theatre.

In 2010, Said featured in a one-woman off-Broadway play, Palestine.

In 2013, Said discussed Arab identity politics with Salon magazine and her approaching of the subject in her book Looking for Palestine.

Works

References

External links
Imeu.net
Salon.com
Pbs.org
Doollee.com

21st-century American dramatists and playwrights
Living people
1974 births
Writers from Boston
Princeton University alumni
Actresses from New York City
American stage actresses
American women dramatists and playwrights
Actresses from Boston
Writers from Manhattan
21st-century American actresses
21st-century American women writers
Chapin School (Manhattan) alumni
American writers of Palestinian descent
Said family